The natural monuments of South Korea constitute a natural heritage system designated by the South Korean government according to the Natural Heritage Protection Law (문화재보호법) that considers significant natural resources, such as animals and plants. As of August 2022, a total of 702 (132+570) animal, plants, landforms, geological formations, and nature reserves had been designated by the Cultural Heritage Administration of South Korea as natural monuments and scenic sites, with 132 being scenic sites, and 570 of them natural monuments. Only 472 of these continue to maintain their natural monument designation, and only 129 maintained their scenic site designation.

History
During the period of Japanese occupation, the Japanese authorities legislated the "Rules to conserve artefacts and historic sites (고적및유물보존규칙)" in July 1916, and a law called The Act of Conserving the Historic Sites, Natural Monuments, Scenic Sites and Treasures of Korea (조선보물고적명승천연기념물보존령) was published on August 1933. After the liberation of Korea, the South Korean government legislated the Natural Heritage Protection Law in 1962.

List
This is a partial list of the natural monuments of South Korea.

1–50
Numbers 2 to 7, 10, 12, 14 to 17, 20 to 26, 31 to 34, 37, and41 to 47 were delisted due to these monuments being destroyed, deemed of lost value of preservation or located in unrestored regions of the Republic of Korea (now occupied by the DPRK, which are matters South Korea deals in the Committee for the Five Northern Korean Provinces).

51–100
Numbers 54 to 58, 61, 67, 68, 70 to 72, 75, 77, 80, 81, 83, 85 to 87, 90, 92, 94, 97, 99, and100 were delisted due to these monuments being destroyed, deemed of lost value of preservation or located in unrestored regions of the Republic of Korea (now occupied by the DPRK, which are matters South Korea deals in the Committee for the Five Northern Korean Provinces), or simply unregistered.

100–199
Numbers, 102  104  105  109  113  116  117 .118, 119 ,120  121 125 127 ,128 129 130 .131,132, 133.134 135,137,139,140,141,142,143,144,145,148,149,157,181,186,187,188 were delisted due to these monuments being destroyed, deemed of lost value of preservation or located in unrestored regions of the Republic of Korea (now occupied by the DPRK, which are matters South Korea deals in the Committee for the Five Northern Korean Provinces), or simply unregistered.

200–400
Numbers, 
208, 210, 213, 230, 231, 257, 258, 264, 269, 276, 277, 282, 290, 297, 306, 308, 310,  316, 338, 350,  353, 369 were delisted due to these monuments being destroyed, deemed of lost value of preservation or located in unrestored regions of the Republic of Korea (now occupied by the DPRK, which are matters South Korea deals in the Committee for the Five Northern Korean Provinces), or simply unregistered.

401–500
Number 425 was delisted due to the tree dying, losing the value to be protected.

501–570
Numbers, 506, 521, 541 were delisted due to these monuments being destroyed or affected by the Typhoons.

See also
Cultural Heritage Administration
Environment of South Korea
Natural monuments of North Korea

References

Notes

Bibliography

Nature conservation in South Korea
Lists of landforms of South Korea